Garamduz may refer to:
Garamduz District
Garamduz Rural District